A digital pen is an input device which captures the handwriting or brush strokes of a user and converts handwritten analog information created using "pen and paper" into digital data, enabling the data to be utilized in various applications. This type of pen is usually used in conjunction with a digital notebook, although the data can also be used for different applications or simply as a graphic.

Smart pen is a more specific term; it has the same basic characteristics, but also has other features like voice recording or a text scanner. A smart pen is generally larger and has more features than an active pen. Digital pens typically contain internal electronics and have features such as touch sensitivity, input buttons, memory for storing handwriting data and transmission capabilities.

Characteristics 

The input device captures the handwriting data, that, once digitized, can be uploaded to a computer and displayed on its monitor.

Some pens are equipped with a digital recording device that allows users to use them as intelligent dictation machines. They can be used, for example for students to record the voice of the teacher while taking

Technology groups

Accelerometer
Accelerometer-based digital pens contain components that detect movement of the pen and contact with the writing surface.

Active
Active pens, such as N-trig's DuoSense Pen, include electronic components whose signals are picked up by a mobile device's built-in digitizer and transmitted to its controller, providing data on pen location, pressure, button presses and other functionality.

Positional
Position-based digital pens use a facility to detect the location of the tip during writing. Some models can be found on graphics tablets made popular by Wacom, and on tablet computers using Wacom's Penabled technology.

Camera
Camera-based pens use special digital paper to detect where the stylus contacts the writing surface, such as those using NeoLAB or/and Anoto technology.

Trackball pen
Trackball pens use a sensor that is located on the pen to detect the motion of the trackball.

See also
Apple Pencil
Digital paper
Bluetooth 
List of pen types, brands and companies
Live Ink Character Recognition Solution
Pen computing
Surface Pen
USB
Voice recorder

References

Computer peripherals
Computing input devices
Writing implements
Pens